The 2018 NAB AFL Under 18 Championships was the 23rd edition of the AFL Under 18 Championships. 

The tournament was played in two divisions, with the best players from across the entire Division 2 Academy series, combined into an Allies team which would then compete in the later five team Division 1 tournament. Thus, division one was made up of 5 teams - Allies, South Australia, Vic Country, Vic Metro and Western Australia - playing each other across 5 rounds. 

South Australia won the division one title for the first time since 2014, Victorian Metro midfielder Sam Walsh won the Larke Medal as the division one best player while Tasmanian Tarryn Thomas won the Hunter Harrison Medal for the best player in the Under 18 Academy Series.

Fixture

Division 1

All-Australian team
The 2018 All-Australian team

References

Under-18